The 2022 Six Nations Championship is the 23rd Six Nations Championship, an annual rugby union competition contested by the national teams of England, France, Ireland, Italy, Scotland and Wales. England are the defending champions. There is no limit on the number of players each team may call up to play in the competition, and initial squad sizes ranged from 33 to 42.

Note: Number of caps and players' ages are indicated as of 5 February 2022 – the tournament's opening day. For players added to a squad during the tournament, their caps and age are indicated as of the date of their call-up.

England
England coach Eddie Jones named an initial 36-man squad for the tournament on 18 January 2022, including six uncapped players.

Head coach:  Eddie Jones

Call-ups
On 24 January, Jonny May withdrew from the squad due to injury and was replaced by Elliot Daly. In addition, George Ford was called up to replace Owen Farrell, who was ruled out of the tournament on 26 January. Nick Isiekwe also joined the squad as injury cover for Courtney Lawes.

On 30 January, Louis Lynagh and Adam Radwan were added to the squad.

On 8 February, Joe Launchbury and Tom Pearson were called up to the squad, while Orlando Bailey was released.

On 15 February, Manu Tuilagi joined up with the squad.

On 1 March, Will Goodrick-Clarke and Lewis Ludlow were included in a fallow week training squad, before returning to their clubs.

On 6 March, Nic Dolly, Alex Mitchell and Sam Underhill were recalled as part of a revised 36-man squad. Luke Cowan-Dickie, Jonny Hill, Lewis Ludlam, Raffi Quirke and Manu Tuilagi were all withdrawn due to injury, while Mark Atkinson, Tommy Freeman, Tom Pearson and Adam Radwan were also released back to their clubs.

On 14 March, Tom Curry withdrew from the squad because of injury, and was replaced by Jack Willis.

France
On 18 January 2022, France coach Fabien Galthié named a 42-man squad for the 2022 Six Nations Championship.

Head coach: Fabien Galthié

Ireland
On 19 January 2022, Ireland coach Andy Farrell named a 37-man squad for the tournament, including two uncapped players. Flanker Cian Prendergast was also included as an additional development player, who would participate in the training camp.

Head coach:  Andy Farrell

Call-ups
On 7 February, Dave Heffernan replaced the injured Rónan Kelleher.

On 21 February, James Lowe and Jimmy O'Brien were added to the squad.

On 7 March, Jeremy Loughman was called up to the squad ahead of the final two rounds of the Championship.

Italy
Italy named a 33-man squad for the tournament on 13 January 2022.

Head coach:  Kieran Crowley

Call-ups
On 24 January, Ange Capuozzo was added to the squad.

On 31 January, Ion Neculai and Enrico Lucchin were added to the squad, with Lucchin initially replacing Luca Morisi due to injury.

On 7 February Andrea Zambonin joined the squad ahead of round 2.

On 23 February Renato Giammarioli and Andrea Lovotti replace Fuser, Negri, Capuozzo, Da Re and Menoncello.

Scotland
Scotland named a 39-man squad for the tournament on 19 January 2022, including five uncapped players.

Head coach: Gregor Townsend

Call-ups
On 25 January, Sean Maitland was added to the squad after Kyle Rowe and Duhan van der Merwe were unable to report to the pre-tournament training camp due to illness.

On 31 January, Jamie Bhatti withdrew from the squad due to injury and was replaced by Allan Dell.

On 21 February, Scotland announced an updated squad for their match against France, which included the new inclusions of Simon Berghan, James Lang, Oli Kebble, 
Ollie Smith and Marshall Sykes.

On 7 March, Adam Hastings, Ross Thompson and Glen Young were called up to the squad whilst Marshall Sykes, Nick Haining, Oli Kebble, Ollie Smith, Rufus McLean withdrew after due to injury.

On 14 March, Fraser Brown, Murphy Walker, Scott Cummings and Jordan Edmunds were added to the squad ahead of Ireland whilst Kiran McDonald, Glen Young and Duhan van der Merwe returned to their clubs.

Wales
Wales named a 36-man squad for the tournament on 18 January 2022. Usual captain Alun Wyn Jones was ruled out of the start of the tournament, so fly-half Dan Biggar was named as his replacement. The squad included three uncapped players: hooker Dewi Lake, and back rowers Jac Morgan and James Ratti.

Head coach:  Wayne Pivac

Call-ups
On 21 February, Taulupe Faletau was called up to the squad after recovering from injury.

On 6 March, Josh Navidi was called up to the squad with Ellis Jenkins being released back to his club.

On 12 March, Alun Wyn Jones was called up to the squad following recovery from injury.

References

squads
2022 Squads